Bellingen Shire is a local government area in the Mid North Coast region of New South Wales, Australia.  The Shire is located adjacent to the Pacific Highway, Waterfall Way and the North Coast railway line.

The Mayor of the Bellingen Shire is Cr. Steve Allan, an independent.

Towns and localities 

Towns and localities in the Bellingen Shire are:

 Bellingen
 Bostobrick
 Brierfield
 Cascade
 Darkwood
 Deer Vale
 Dorrigo
 Fernmount
 Gleniffer
 Hydes Creek
 Leigh
 Megan
 Mylestom
 Orama
 Raleigh
 Repton
 Tarkeeth
 Thora
 Urunga
 Valery

Demographics

Aboriginal and Torres Strait Islander people made up 3.0 per cent of the population which is higher than the national and state averages of 2.5 per cent. The median age of people in the Bellingen Shire was 46 years; some 10 years higher than the national median. Children aged 0 – 14 years made up 19.5 per cent of the population and people aged 65 years and over made up 19.9 per cent of the population. Of people in the area aged 15 years and over, 46.1 per cent were married and 17.4 per cent were either divorced or separated.

When compared with total population growth of Australia for the same periods, being 5.78 per cent and 8.32 per cent respectively, population growth in the Bellingen local government area was significantly lower than the national average. The median weekly income for residents within the Bellingen Shire was significantly below the national average, being one of the factors that place the Bellingen Shire in an area of social disadvantage.

At the 2011 Census, the proportion of residents in the Bellingen local government area who stated their ancestry as Australian or Anglo-Celtic exceeded 82 per cent of all residents (national average was 65.2 per cent). In excess of 69 per cent of all residents in the Bellingen Shire nominated a religious affiliation with Christianity at the 2011 Census, which was significantly above the national average of 50.2 per cent. Meanwhile, as at the Census date, compared to the national average, households in the Bellingen local government area had a significantly lower than average proportion (4.7 per cent) where two or more languages are spoken (national average was 20.4 per cent); and a significantly higher proportion (94.1 per cent) where English only was spoken at home (national average was 76.8 per cent).

Council 

Bellingen Shire Council is composed of seven Councillors, including the Mayor, for a fixed four-year term of office. The Mayor is directly elected while the six other Councillors are elected proportionally as one entire ward. The most recent election was held on 4 December 2021, and the makeup of the council, including the Mayor, is as follows:

The current Council, elected in 2021, in order of election, is:

See also

 Local government areas of New South Wales

References 

 
Local government areas of New South Wales
Mid North Coast